The Criminal Justice Administration Act 1851 (14 & 15 Vict c 55) is an Act of the Parliament of the United Kingdom.

Sections 1 to 3

Section 1 was repealed by the Statute Law Revision Act 1875.

Section 2 was repealed by section 10 of, and the Schedule to, the Costs in Criminal Cases Act 1908.

Section 3 was repealed by the Statute Law Revision Act 1875.

Section 4
This section repealed section 26 of the Criminal Law Act 1826. It was repealed by the Statute Law Revision Act 1875.

Sections 5 to 17
Sections 5 to 8 were repealed by section 10 of, and Schedule 3 to, the Criminal Law Act 1967.

Sections 9 to 11 were repealed by section 20(2) of, and Part I of Schedule 5 to, the Criminal Justice Administration Act 1962.

Section 12 was repealed by section 132 of, and Schedule 6 to, the Magistrates' Courts Act 1952.

Section 13 was repealed by section 10 of, and Schedule 3 to, the Criminal Law Act 1967.

Section 14 was repealed by section 5 of, and Schedule 2 to, the Middlesex Sessions Act 1874.

Sections 15 and 16 were repealed by the Statute Law Revision Act 1950.

Section 17 was repealed by the Statute Law Revision Act 1875.

Section 18 - Indorsement of warrants in the Channel Islands

The words at the start were repealed by the Statute Law Revision Act 1892.

"The said Acts"

This expression refers to section 13 of the Indictable Offences Act 1848 and the former section 3 of the Summary Jurisdiction Act 1848.

"The said section of the Indictable Offences Act 1848"

This expression refers to section 13 of that Act.

See also Bailiff of Jersey and Bailiff of Guernsey.

Sections 19 to 25
Section 19 was repealed by section 10(2) of, and Part I of Schedule 3 to, the Criminal Law Act 1967.

Sections 20 and 21 were repealed by the Statute Law Revision Act 1892.

Section 22 was repealed by the Statute Law Revision Act 1875.

Sections 23 to 25 were repealed by section 10(2) of, and Part I of Schedule 3 to, the Criminal Law Act 1967.

See also
Criminal Justice Act

References
Charles Sprengel Greaves. Lord Campbell's Acts, for the Further Improving the Administration of Criminal Justice, and the Better Prevention of Offences. Together with the Act for the Better Protection of Apprentices and Servants; and the Act for Amending the Law Relating to the Expenses of Prosecutions. Late W Benning & Co. Fleet Street, London. 1851. Pages 54 to 72.
Robert Richard Pearce. The New Law of Indictments; comprising Lord Campbell's Administration of Criminal Justice Improvement Act; An Act for the Better Prevention of Offences; and An Act to Amend the Law Relating to the Expenses of Prosecutions, &c. S Sweet, and Stevens & Norton. London. 1851. Pages 54 to 72.
"Criminal Justice Administration Act 1851". Halsbury's Statutes of England and Wales. Fourth Edition. LexisNexis. 2008 Reissue. Volume 12(1). Page 115.
"The Criminal Justice Administration Act 1851". Halsbury's Statutes of England. Third Edition. Butterworths. London. 1969. Volume 8. Page 108.
"The Criminal Justice Administration Act, 1851". Halsbury's Statutes of England. First Edition. Butterworth & Co (Publishers) Ltd. Bell Yard, Temple Bar, London. 1929. Volume 4:  . Page 523. See also pages 256 and 740.
William Hanbury Aggs. Chitty's Statutes of Practical Utility. Sixth Edition. Sweet and Maxwell. Stevens and Sons. Chancery Lane, London. 1912. Volume 3. Title "Criminal Law". Page 252 et seq.
John Mounteney Lely. "The Criminal Justice Administration Act, 1851". The Statutes of Practical Utility. (Chitty's Statutes). Fifth Edition. Sweet and Maxwell. Stevens and Sons. London. 1894. Volume 3. Title "Criminal Law". Pages 72 to 78.
John Mounteney Lely. Chitty's Collection of Statutes of Practical Utility. Fourth Edition. Henry Sweet. Stevens and Sons. Chancery Lane, London. 1880. Volume 2. Title "Criminal Law". Pages 257 to 262. Volume 3. Title "Justices". Pages 1049 to 1051.
The Statutes: Third Revised Edition. HMSO. London. 1950. Volume 6. Page 86 et seq.
The Statutes: Second Revised Edition. Printed under the authority of HMSO. London. 1894. Volume 8. Pages 825 to 831.
The Statutes: Revised Edition. London. 1877. Volume 11. Pages 54 to 61.
William Paterson (ed). "Expenses of Prosecutions Act". The Practical Statutes of the Session 1851. John Crockford. Essex Street, Strand, London. 1851. Pages 120 to 133.
William Cunningham Glen. "1 Expenses of Prosecutions". The Summary Jurisdiction Acts, 1848-1884. Fifth Edition. Shaw & Sons. London. 1884. Appendix. Pages 453 to 464.

External links
The Criminal Justice Administration Act 1851, as amended from the National Archives.
The Criminal Justice Administration Act 1851, as originally enacted from the National Archives.

United Kingdom Acts of Parliament 1851
Criminal law of the United Kingdom